The Ministry of Culture (Abrv: MOC;), is a Thai government body responsible for the oversight of culture, religion, and art in Thailand. Its FY2019 budget is 8,209.4 million baht.

History
The Division of Culture was established in 1938 under the Department of Fine Arts. In 1952 it became the Ministry of Culture with the Department of Fine Arts as a subordinate agency. In 1958 it was renamed the Division of Culture and placed under the aegis of the Ministry of Education (MOE). In 2002, it was re-established as the Ministry of Culture.

In July 2019, Itthiphol Khunpluem, a former mayor of Pattaya, was appointed Minister of Culture.

Departmental organisation
 Office of the Minister
 Office of the Permanent Secretary
Provincial Cultural Office
Religion Affairs Department
Fine Arts Department
National Library of Thailand
National Archives of Thailand is a Thai government agency under Fine Arts Department, established in 1916 (B.E. 2459) as a section of National Library of Thailand. It has functioned as a division of the Fine Arts department since 1952 (B.E. 2495).
 Performing Arts Office
Department of Cultural Promotion
Film Censorship Board (FCB)
Office of Contemporary Art and Culture
Bunditpatanasilpa Institute

Associated organizations
Princess Maha Chakri Sirindhorn Anthropology Centre
Thai Film Archive
Moral Promotion Center
Office of Media Fund

History of the Thai Nation
Thailand's military junta was criticized for a history textbook it ordered written by the Fine Arts Department of the ministry. The book, History of the Thai Nation,  claims that the military has established "true democracy" in Thailand and has eliminated corruption.
In 2015 the ministry's Fine Arts Department published History of the Thai Nation at the order of the National Council for Peace and Order (NCPO). The NCPO wanted a new history book covering the past 400 years to foster "national reconciliation". The book was written in two months. On page 195, the text reads, "Gen Prayut Chan-o-cha as Prime Minister has carried out a policy of reforming the country, reforming politics to be truly a democracy, eliminating corruption and using moral principles to lead the country to be truly a democracy." On page 197 it goes on to say, "After the coup d'etat, Gen Prayut became prime minister. He has tried to develop the country and reform Thai politics into a real democracy. Gen Prayut has used moral principles and stamped out corruption to return democracy to the country." The book maintains that the NCPO was forced to stage the 2014 coup to end the political chaos caused by the civilian government of the time. Ten thousand copies of the book were published at a cost of one million baht. Twenty copies autographed by Prayut were sold at the launch. In November 2017, the prime minister ordered the Fine Arts Department to send 100 copies of the book to each of Thailand's provinces. A leading critic of the junta charged that, "The content of the book is misleading and it will lead to the distortion of the country's history [if not corrected]." The culture ministry plans to translate the book to English for distribution to Thai embassies worldwide.

See also
Cabinet of Thailand
List of Government Ministers of Thailand
Government of Thailand

References

 
Culture
Thai culture
Religion in Thailand
Arts in Thailand
Thailand